Jameela McCarthy (born 20 June 1995) is a Trinidadian netball player who plays for Trinidad and Tobago in the positions of goal defense, goal keeper or goal shooter. She represented Trinidad and Tobago at the 2019 Netball World Cup which also marked her debut appearance at a Netball World Cup tournament. She also plays for Defence Force at the Female Basketball Association League (FemBA).

References 

1995 births
Living people
Trinidad and Tobago netball players
2019 Netball World Cup players